This is a list of United States Soldiers, Sailors, Airmen, and Marines who were decorated with one of the three highest courage awards of the United States Armed Forces, for heroism and gallantry during the Anbar campaign of the Iraq War in the Al Anbar Governorate:
 Medal of Honor, awarded by the United States government 
 any of the collective service cross medals, each with a name unique to the service branch awarding them:
 Distinguished Flying Cross, awarded by the United States Department of the Air Force
 Distinguished Service Cross, awarded by the United States Department of the Army
 Navy Cross, awarded by the United States Department of the Navy
 Silver Star, awarded by any one of the above mentioned departments 

An asterisk after a recipient's name indicates that the award was given posthumously.

Medal of Honor

Service Crosses

Silver Star

Notes

References

United States Army lists
United States Navy lists
United States Marine Corps lists
Recipients of United States military awards and decorations
Lists of American military personnel